This is an incomplete list for rulers with the title of Qore (king) or Kandake (queen) of the Kingdom of Kush.  Some of the dates are only rough estimates.  While the chronological list is well known, only a few monarchs have definite dates.  

These include those leaders who also ruled Ancient Egypt and those who ruled during famous invasions or famous trade expeditions. The others are based on estimates made by Fritz Hintze. The estimates are based on the average length of the reigns, which were then shortened or lengthened based on the size and splendour of the monarch's tomb, the assumption being that monarchs who reigned longer had more time and resources to build their burial sites.  An added complication is that in recent years, there have been disputes as to which monarch belongs to which tomb.

Dates are definite and accurate for the Kushite rulers of the Twenty-fifth Dynasty of Egypt, when Egypt was invaded and absorbed by the Kushite Empire. The dates are also certain for kings Aspelta, Arakamani, Nastasen, and for the Kandakes Shanakdakhete, Amanirenas, Amanishakheto, Amanitore, and Amanikhatashan.

The early part of the chronology is incomplete. The graves and pyramid burials in Sudan consist of remains of at least fourteen monarchs of the Kushite Empire preceding Piankhi, the earliest tomb of which dates from about 1020 BCE. Two of these are known: Alara and Kashta, who immediately preceded Piankhi. It also is possible that another of the burials may have been of Aserkamani, who was living in 950 BCE and who carried out expeditions in Egypt and along the Mediterranean coast of North Africa.

Pre-Napatan period

Napatan period 
The period starting with Kashta and ending with Malonaqen is sometimes called the Napatan period. During this period, the seat of government and the royal palace were in Napata, and Meroë was a provincial city. The kings and queens are buried in Nuri and El-Kurru.

 The numbering of the kings is based on László Török's The kingdom of Kush: handbook..

First phase

Twenty-fifth Dynasty of Egypt 
King Piye invades Egypt, and for seven decades, Kushites rule Egypt.

Second phase 
The Kushites no longer control Egypt. The Kings rule over Napata and Meroe as before the conquest of Egypt.

Meroitic period

First phase 
The Kings ruled over Napata and Meroe. The seat of government and the royal palace are in Meroe. The Main temple of Amun is located in Napata, but the temple at Meroe is under construction. Kings and many queens are buried in Nuri, some queens are buried in Meroe, in the West Cemetery.

Second phase 
The seat of government and the royal palace are in Meroe. Kings and many queens are buried in Meroe, in the South Cemetery. Napata's only importance is the Amun Temple.

Third phase 
The seat of government and the royal palace are in Meroe. Kings are buried in Meroe, in the North Cemetery, and Queens in West Cemetery.  Napata's only importance is the Amun Temple. Meroe flourishes and many building projects are undertaken.

Crown princes from the time of Natakamani and Amanitore
Arikhankharer
Arikakahtani

Fourth phase 
Twilight of the Meroitic Culture. Kings are buried in Meroe, in the North Cemetery, and Queens in West Cemetery. In 350 CE Meroe is destroyed by Axum.

 List and dates from The Cambridge history of Africa, by J.D. Fage, and R.A. Oliver and from The kingdom of Kush: the Napatan and Meroitic empires, by Derek A. Welsby. The order in which the kings and queens ruled and dates are not consistent between authors. Approximate dates have been given.

(Unknown sequence thereafter)

See also
Kandake, female rulers of Kush

References

Sources

External links 
The Rise of the Kushite Kingdom by Brian Yare

+
+
+
Kush
Kush
Monarchs Of Kush
Kush
Kush
Kush